Francis Delaisi (19 November 1873 – 22 July 1947) was a French economist.

References

External links
 

1873 births
1947 deaths
20th-century French non-fiction writers
French economists
Human Rights League (France) members
People from Mayenne
French collaborators with Nazi Germany
20th-century French male writers
French male non-fiction writers